The Men's recurve 90m event at the 2010 South American Games was held on March 20 at 9:00.

Medalists

Results

References
Report

70m Recurve Men